Sri Lankabhimanya (The Pride of Sri Lanka) is the highest national honours of Sri Lanka awarded by the President of Sri Lanka on behalf of the Government, falling alongside the National Hero of Sri Lanka. It is the country's highest civil honour and is conferred upon "those who have rendered exceptionally outstanding and most distinguished service to the nation". The honour can only be held by five Sri Lankans at any given time, and may also be conferred posthumously; A. T. Ariyaratne and Karu Jayasuriya are the only living recipients of the award. Since 1986, it has been awarded 9 times.

The honour is conventionally used as a title or prefix to the name of the person who receives the award.

Insignia
The insignia consists of a badge, suspended from the neck and a sash, passing from the left shoulder to the right hip.

Recipients

References

External links
 National Awards Conferred by His Excellency the President of Sri Lanka

 
Civil awards and decorations of Sri Lanka